Arthur Bernard Langlie (July 25, 1900 – July 24, 1966) was an American politician who served as the mayor of Seattle, Washington and was the 12th and 14th governor of the U.S. state of Washington from 1941 to 1945 and 1949 to 1957. He is the only mayor of Seattle to be elected governor of Washington.

Early life and education
Langlie was born in Lanesboro, Minnesota. His father, Bjarne Langlie, had emigrated from Norway. His mother, Carrie Dahl, was of Norwegian and Dutch ancestry. He moved with his family to Washington's Kitsap Peninsula at the age of nine. Langlie was graduated from Union High School, in Bremerton, Washington. Langlie earned a Bachelor of Laws from the University of Washington in 1925, where he was a member of Phi Kappa Sigma fraternity.

Career
After graduating from the University of Washington, Langlie became a senior partner in the law firm of Langlie, Todd, and Nickell.

He practiced law in Seattle for nearly 10 years before winning a Seattle City Council seat in 1935 as a candidate of the New Order of Cincinnatus. He served as mayor of Seattle from 1938 to 1941. He became the Republican candidate for governor in 1940 and won a narrow victory. He is to date the only mayor of Seattle to be elected governor of Washington.

At 40, Langlie was the youngest governor in the history of the state until Dan Evans was elected. Langlie was defeated for re-election in 1944 by Democrat Monrad C. Wallgren but won the office back by defeating Wallgren in 1948. Langlie is the only Washington governor to regain that office after losing it.

In 1952, he was one of five people on the shortlist for the Republican vice presidential nomination. Dwight Eisenhower instead chose Richard Nixon. He was an unsuccessful candidate for the United States Senate in 1956. Langlie's legacy as governor included the establishment of the Washington State Ferries system, the completion of road and bridge projects, and some of the first environmental measures adopted in the state of Washington.

Langlie left politics after failing in his 1956 campaign to defeat Democratic U.S. Senator Warren G. Magnuson. Los Angeles financier Norton Simon asked Langlie to take charge of the McCall publishing house that Simon had just acquired. In 1958, Langlie was named as the new president of the McCall Corporation.

References

Other sources
George W. Scott Arthur B. Langlie; Republican Governor in a Democratic Age (Ph.D. dissertation, University of Washington. 1971)

External links

Frederick G. Hamley Papers, 1934-1956. 6.83 cubic feet. At the Labor Archives of Washington, University of Washington Special Collections.

|-

|-

|-

|-

|-

|-

1900 births
1966 deaths
20th-century American politicians
American people of Dutch descent
American people of Norwegian descent
American Presbyterians
Republican Party governors of Washington (state)
Mayors of Seattle
University of Washington School of Law alumni
People from Lanesboro, Minnesota